Madeleine Vramant was a member of the Chambre Syndicale de la Haute Couture and one of only a few couturiers that kept their fashion house open during World War II, along with Jacques Fath, Maggy Rouff, Nina Ricci and Marcel Rochas.

References

External links 
 

Haute couture
History of fashion
High fashion brands
Clothing companies of France